The 2006 KNSB Dutch Single Distance Championships took place in Heerenveen at the Thialf ice rink on 27–30 December 2005. Although this tournament was held in 2005 it was the 2006 edition as it was part of the 2005–2006 speed skating season.

Schedule

Medalists

Men

Source: www.schaatsen.nl  & SchaatsStatistieken.nl

Women

Source: www.schaatsen.nl  & SchaatsStatistieken.nl

References

D
D
Speed
2006 Single Distance
KNSB Dutch Single Distance Championships, 2006